Gonzaga Institute, Palermo, is a private Catholic primary and secondary school located in Palermo, Sicily, Italy. The school was founded by the Society of Jesus in 1919. It offers educational programs for children from 18 months to 18 years, including an international school that facilitates entrance to universities worldwide. Gonzaga became coeducational in 1996 by uniting with Ancelle Institute for girls, its next door neighbour.

Overview 
In 2008–09 there were 1459 pupils in the various schools: International, 22; military, 130 ; primary 444; secondary 281; classic liceo, 252; scientific liceo, 112; European language, 218 pupils.

In May 2017 the school introduced one of the first STEM programs in Italy for the enhancement of education in science.

Notable alumni 

 Renzo Barbera, businessman and sportsman  
 Paolo Giaccone, professor, forensic pathologist and Mafia's victim 
 Enrico La Loggia, politician
 Raimondo Lanza di Trabia, businessman and sportsman  
 Piersanti Mattarella, politician and Mafia's victim 
 Francesco Musotto, politician
 Leoluca Orlando, Mayor of Palermo
 Sandro Paternostro, journalist
 Giuseppe Provenzano, politician
 Flavia Sparacino, scientist

See also

 Education in Italy
 List of schools in Italy
 List of Jesuit schools

References  

Jesuit secondary schools in Italy
Jesuit primary schools in Italy
Educational institutions established in 1919
1919 establishments in Italy
International schools in Italy
Education in Palermo